Durston House School is a private preparatory school in the UK for boys aged 4–13. It is a leading west London prep school and is a noted feeder school of Merchant Taylors’, John Lyon, Hampton and St Paul's School. Day fees range from £4,340 to £5,230 per term, though scholarships and bursaries are available.

In 2015, the Independent Schools Inspectorate observed that "The school is successful in meeting its aim of providing an outstanding education."

History 
Durston House was founded by the brothers Ben and Robert Pearce in 1886 as a Christian foundation and was essentially proprietary for its first hundred years of existence. The educational charity that runs the school was launched in 1986, the school's centenary year and the school has since trebled its size, with a pupil threshold of approximately 380. Its current Headmaster is Giles Entwisle, who succeeded Ian Kendrick in September 2020.

Facilities
The school is located on three different sites within close proximity, the middle and upper school at 12-14 Castlebar Road, the Pre-prep building at 26 Castlebar Road, and the junior school which was extended and refurbished. The project was completed in 2014. Durston House enjoys the benefits of being a big modern school with facilities which further enhance the education it provides. The school owns two large playing fields both equipped with large pavilions, offering floodlit tennis and basketball courts. In addition, there are specialist art rooms and science laboratories to facilitate specialist study.

An annual Carol Service and Spring Concert are held in the nearby St Peter's Church.

References

External links

Profile on the ISC website

Private boys' schools in London
Private schools in the London Borough of Ealing
Preparatory schools in London